Yeosu (Yeosu-si), historically also Yosu, and known to the Japanese  as Reisui during the period when Korea was under Japanese rule, is a city located on the southern coast of the Korean Peninsula in South Jeolla Province, South Korea and comprises the Old Yeosu City, founded in 1949, Yeocheon City, founded in 1986, and Yeocheon County which were merged into the current Yeosu city in 1998.

Characteristics
The city of Yeosu consists of the Yeosu peninsula as well as 365 islands (48 inhabited, 317 uninhabited).  Being midway along the southern coast of South Korea, it is flanked by Namhae County in South Gyeongsang Province to the east with a natural waterway, and the Bay of Suncheon to the west and northwest, the city of Suncheon sprawling along its banks. The city has three different city halls.  On 1 April 1998, the cities of Yeosu and Yeocheon, along with Yeocheon County merged to form the unified city of Yeosu.

Yeosu has cool summers and mild winters.  Its ocean climate also brings Yeosu relatively longer springs and autumns than other regions. 
Yeosu is a city of history and loyalty where the headquarters of South Jeolla Province Navy Base was located, and the Great Admiral Yi Sun-sin improved upon the geobukseon (turtle ship) to save the country while serving as the commander of the navy.

Due to its appeal as an international ocean resort and tourist city, as well as its close proximity to the Yeocheon Industrial Complex, Yeosu has seen much development during the past several decades.

In the 142nd General Assembly of BIE, held in Paris on 26 November 2007, the global community selected Yeosu as the host city for the 2012 World Expo. This was Korea's second World Expo, following Daejeon's 1993 Fair.

History 

Wonchon-hyeon/Dolsan-hyeon was the name given to Yeosu in the 16th year of King Seong (538 AD) who was the king of Baekje Kingdom. The name changed to Haeub-hyeon/Yeosan-hyeon in 757 and to Yeosu-hyeon/Dolsan-hyeon in 940. Beginning in 1479, the Joseon Dynasty's Naval Headquarters for eastern sector of Jeolla Province was located there.  As such, it was the first base where Admiral Yi Sun-sin's fleet was based during the Imjin War which used the Turtle Ship or 'Kobukseon' which was built in Seon-so.

In 1897, Yeosu was renamed Yeosu-myeon and included in the new county of Yeosu-gun. In 1914, Yeosu-gun merged with Dolsan-gun, further increasing its territory. Yeosu-myeon continued to grow and in 1931, Yeosu-myeon became Yeosu-eup. In 1949, Yeosu became a city. In 1998, Yeosu city merged with Yeochon city and Yeochon-gun, creating the unified city of Yeosu.

Yeosu-si, Yeocheon-si, and Yeocheon-gun were merged into Yeosu-si on April 1, 1998. The former Yeocheon City Hall was divided into two buildings and the former Yeocheon County Office into three buildings.

Yeosu Rebellion

In October 1948, the town of Yeosu was taken by South Korean soldiers who refused to take part in the suppression of the ongoing Jeju Uprising.

Yeosu Expo Station 
On December 25, 1920, Yeosu Station started to operate as a railway that connects Yeosu and Gwangju. On October 1, 2011, however, the station was relocated to Deokchung-dong and renamed Yeosu Expo Station, as the venue served for Yeosu World Expo in 2012.

Festivals 
Hyangiram Sunrise Festival (여수향일암일출제) is an annual festival that begins on New Year’s Eve. It takes place at Hyangiram Hermitage, a historical building that was built in the year 644. The word “Hyangiram” itself refers to “a hermitage facing the sun”, in which visitors could view the breathtaking panorama of sunrise over the horizon. The festival consists of other activities and cultural events such as fireworks, folk street music, and lighting of wishes.

Attractions

Hyangiram Hermitage 

 Hyangiram Hermitage, a Buddhist Temple that was first built by Monk Wonhyo in the 7th century (644), is situated at the top of Mount Geomosan. Before it was renamed, the temple was initially known as Wontongam Hermitage. In the 9th year (958) of Goryeo King Gwangjong’s reign, the temple has been renamed Geumoam Hermitage by Monk Yunpil. Meanwhile, Monk Inmuk changed its name for one last time during King Sejong’s Joseon era (1715), which results in its current name Hyangiram Hermitage. 
 Hyangilam is a temple, that is composed of Daeungjeon and Kwon Yin-jeon, Yongwangjeon, Samsung-gak, Jonggak, Jaejabe and Jongmuil. It is on the hill of a steep mountain bordering the sea. and on the 31st and 1 January of each year, a festival of sunrise is held every year and it is a sunny spot where tourists from all over the country gather. The name of "Hwangilam" is derived from the fact that the thick camellia between the rocky cliffs of Geumo Mountain is blessed with the sunrise of the South Sea.
 A fire had destroyed some parts of the temple, including the main hall, Daeungjeon Hall. In order to remain the cultural heritage, there are numerous parts of the temple have been restructured, and restored. It is also being said that, anyone who passes all seven stone caves along the path to Hyangiram Hermitage would have their wish granted.  

 Yeongchwisan Mountain has traditionally been regarded as the Yeosu peninsula’s spiritual protector. There are two Buddhist Temples on the mountain: Geumseongdae and Dosolam Hermitage, where ritual ceremonies and prayers were held during ancient days. With only 510 meters above sea level, Yeongchwisan Mountain is an ideal place for family and hiking lovers. It only takes around four hours to reach the peak of the mountain. Also known for its azalea flower blossoms, an azalea festival is held annually on the mountain in April during spring. The festival provides a range of events, where visitors could enjoy local food, participate in spiritual activities, and contests. 

 In the harbour there is a full-size model of one of Admiral Yi's turtle ships, which are timber shelled vessels that were used with great success against the Japanese navy.
 Manseongri Beach near Yeosu has volcanic 'black' sand and is popular with Korean tourists. Recently, the famous Korean band Busker Busker made a song based on Manseongri Beach's night view. This popularised the site with Korean tourists. There are public showers and restrooms as well as on-duty lifeguards.  Many restaurants located along the beach have beach-side tables and serve various seafood dishes.  It is possible to take ferries to many of the local islands for an authentic taste of rural Korean food.
 Dolsan bridge has changing lights at night. It is a  bridge connecting downtown Yeosu with Dolsan Island. Dolsan Park overlooks Dolsan bridge. The bridge is cable-stayed with 28 steel cables with diameters of 56–87 mm wired to a 62 m steel tower at the each end of the bridge. The bridge is 20 m above sea level. There are many seafood restaurants and romantic cafés around the area. 
 The Odongdo Island of Yeosu is one of the most spectacular spots to appreciate camelias. There are 70 species of wild flowers that flourish here, a hill commemorating the plantation of the very first tree and a spacious grassy field. A small population of local finless porpoises are present here.
 Opened in December 2014, the Yeosu Cable Car connects Dolsan Island with Odongdo and offers excellent views of the area and the Dolsan Bridge.

Big-O show is a famous show in Yeosu which features an ocean fountain event and a hologram show. The show consists of three parts. The fountain spouts in accordance with classic and jazz music. Unique to this fountain is a large round steel frame at its centre.
 The Ocean Resort is home to Yeosu's only waterpark. It offers condominium-style rooms and other facilities. Located in Soho-dong, the resort overlooks the yacht marina.
Hanhwa aqua planet is a large aquarium that has four exhibition halls - marine life, aqua forest, ocean life, and alive museum. The main water tank performances include synchronized swimming and Pierrot's acrobatics.
Hyangilam is a temple, that is composed of Daeungjeon and Kwon Yin-jeon, Yongwangjeon, Samsung-gak, Jonggak, Jaejabe and Jongmuil. It is on the hill of a steep mountain bordering the sea. and on the 31st and 1 January of each year, a festival of sunrise is held every year and it is a sunny spot where tourists from all over the country gather. The name of "Hwangilam" is derived from the fact that the thick camellia between the rocky cliffs of Geumo Mountain is blessed with the sunrise of the South Sea.

Local specialities
Gejang, or marinated raw crab is a representative speciality of Yeosu and a traditional Jeolla cuisine dish.

Dolsan 'gat kimchi' is also a specialty of Yeosu.

Population
Yeosu has a population of 282,946 as of May 2019.

Climate
Yeosu has a humid subtropical climate (Köppen: Cwa) with very warm summers and cold winters.

Sister cities

 Hangzhou, Zhejiang, China
 Karatsu, Saga, Japan
 Kota Kinabalu, Malaysia
 Sikeston, Missouri, United States
 Vanino, Khabarovsk Krai, Russia
 Weihai, Shandong, China
 Port of Spain, Trinidad and Tobago
 Santiago de Querétaro, Querétaro, Mexico
 Lishui, Zhejiang, China
 Cebu City, Philippines
 Belize City, Belize
 Seward, Alaska, United States of America

Notable people
 Maangchi (Real Name: Emily Kim or Kim Kwang-Sook, Hangul: 김광숙), Korean-American YouTuber and author
 Chaesol (Real Name: Moon Chae-sol, Hangul: 문채솔), singer, dancer and K-pop idol, member of K-pop girlgroup cignature and former member of K-pop girlgroup Good Day
 Dohee (Real Name: Min Do-hee, Hangul: 민도희), singer, dancer, actress and K-pop idol, former member of K-pop girlgroup Tiny-G

See also
 List of cities in South Korea
 Korea2012 Yeosu Expo

References

External links

City government

 

 
Cities in South Jeolla Province
Populated places established in 1949
Port cities and towns in South Korea